Karen Paquin (born August 3, 1987) is a Canadian rugby union player. Known for her power and speed, she is skilled at both the sevens and 15s version of the game.

International play
She represented  at the 2014 Women's Rugby World Cup. She was a member of Canada's women's sevens team that were runners-up at the 2013 Rugby World Cup Sevens in Russia.

She won a gold medal at the 2015 Pan American Games as a member of the Canadian women's rugby sevens team.

In 2016, Paquin was named to Canada's first ever women's rugby sevens Olympic team.

Suffering a knee injury at the 2017 Women's Rugby World Cup, Paquin underwent surgeries and rehabilition for three years before returning to the pitch. She made her first appearance back at the Kitakysushu Sevens in 2019 where Canada earned a gold medal.

In June 2021, Paquin was named to Canada's 2020 Summer Olympics team. She was selected in Canada's squad for the 2021 Rugby World Cup in New Zealand.

Personal
She studied chemical engineering at Université Laval.

Occasionally plays rugby with local women's teams on Vancouver Island, BC.

References

External links
 Rugby Canada Player Profile 
 
 
 
 

1987 births
Living people
Canadian female rugby union players
Canada international women's rugby sevens players
Rugby sevens players at the 2015 Pan American Games
Pan American Games gold medalists for Canada
Rugby sevens players at the 2016 Summer Olympics
Olympic rugby sevens players of Canada
Canada international rugby sevens players
Canada women's international rugby union players
Female rugby sevens players
Olympic bronze medalists for Canada
Olympic medalists in rugby sevens
Medalists at the 2016 Summer Olympics
Sportspeople from Quebec City
Pan American Games medalists in rugby sevens
Laval Rouge et Or athletes
Medalists at the 2015 Pan American Games
Rugby sevens players at the 2020 Summer Olympics